The Department of the Interior was an Australian government department that existed between April 1939 and December 1972. It was the second so-named Australian Government department.

Scope
Information about the department's functions and/or government funding allocation could be found in the Administrative Arrangements Orders, the annual Portfolio Budget Statements and in the department's annual reports.

The department was diverse and dealt with a broad range of activities. According to the Administrative Arrangements Order (AAO) made on 30 November 1939, the department dealt with:
Aliens - registration of 
Ashmore and Cartier Islands 
Assisted Migration 
Astronomy 
Australian Capital Territory - administration of 
Australian War Memorial 
Conveyance of Members of Parliament and others 
Co-ordination of Australian Transport Services 
Elections and franchise 
Emigration of children and aboriginals 
Forestry 
Geodesy 
Immigration 
Indentured Coloured labour 
Lands and Surveys 
Maintenance and operation of electric light, water and sewerage services in the Australian Capital Territory
Meteorology 
Naturalisation 
Northern Territory 
Oil Investigation and prospecting 
Passports 
Preparation of design and execution of all Commonwealth Architectural and Engineering Works in the States, Northern Territory and ACT including works for the Commonwealth Bank of Australia 
Properties transferred, rented or acquired 
Public Works and Services 
Prospecting for precious metals (assistance for) 
Railways 
River Murray Waters Commission 
Rivers, roads and bridges 
Solar observatory

Structure
The department was a Commonwealth Public Service department, staffed by officials who were responsible to the Minister for the Interior.

Notes

References and further reading

Ministries established in 1939
Interior
1939 establishments in Australia
1972 disestablishments in Australia